The Arkansas Thomas Cat, "A Journalistic Highball Run by a Heathen," was a humorous weekly magazine founded by Jefferson Davis Orear  and published in Hot Springs, Arkansas between 1890 and 1945, when it was suspended for a year and continued as a monthly until about 1950.

The publication contained mostly satire and humorous stories, but also occasionally exposed misdeeds of prominent citizens, especially Arkansas politicians.

Orear was a friend of Bat Masterson.

References

Defunct magazines published in the United States
Humor magazines
Magazines established in 1890
Magazines disestablished in 1950
Magazines published in Arkansas
Monthly magazines published in the United States
Satirical magazines published in the United States
Weekly magazines published in the United States